The Ruff Guide to Genre-Terrorism is the first full-length release by Manchester, UK based Sonic Boom Six. This album marks the first recording by SB6 since the departure of original guitarist Dave "Hellfire" Kelly.

Track listing
Do It Today - 4:31
Apathy Begins At Home - 3:42
All-In (feat. Coolie Ranx) - 4:32
Piggy In The Middle - 4:03
For Unlawful Carnal Knowledge - 3:59
Northern Skies - 3:39
Bigger Than Punk Rock - 3:30
Danger! Danger! - 3:23
Don't Say I Never Warned Ya - 3:47
Shareena - 4:27
A People's History Of The Future - 3:45
Until The Sunlight Comes - 7:06

2008 US CD version
Found it, Burnt it, Fucked Off
All-In [Tim G Remix]

2009 UK CD version
Piggy In The Middle [Demo]
Shareena [Demo]
All-In [Tim G Remix]
Northern Skies [Babyboom Remix]

Notes 
This CD was the band's first release on Deck Cheese, with their previous CDs having been on Moon Ska Europe. A demo of A People's History Of The Future was posted on the band's MySpace profile in 2005, although the song was very different at the time and was called The World's A Twisted Place (But It Won't Twist Me). All-In features guest vocals from Coolie Ranx.

External links 
 Deck Cheese releases page

References 

Sonic Boom Six albums
2006 albums